Torre a Castello is a village in Tuscany, central Italy, administratively a frazione of the comune of Asciano, province of Siena. At the time of the 2001 census its population was 57.

Torre a Castello is about 25 km from Siena and 23 km from Asciano.

References 

Frazioni of Asciano